Henry John Innes-Ker, 8th Duke of Roxburghe  (24 July 1876 – 29 September 1932) was a Scottish peer and courtier.

Early life

Henry John Innes-Ker was born on 24 July 1876. He was the son of James Henry Robert Innes-Ker, 7th Duke of Roxburghe (1839–1892) and Lady Anne Emily Spencer-Churchill (1854–1923), the fourth daughter of John Spencer-Churchill, 7th Duke of Marlborough, who served in Conservative governments as Lord President of the Council and Lord Lieutenant of Ireland, and his wife, Lady Frances Vane, daughter of the 3rd Marquess of Londonderry. His first cousin was Winston Churchill. His younger brother, Lord Robert Edward Innes-Ker (1885–1958) married the actress Jose Collins.

He attended the Royal Military College, Sandhurst and Eton College.

Peerage
On 23 October 1892, following his father's death, he succeeded to the titles of 8th Duke of Roxburghe, 8th Marquess of Bowmont and Cessford, 12th Earl of Roxburghe, 8th Earl of Kelso, 3rd Earl Innes, 8th Viscount of Broxmouth, 9th Baronet Innes, 12th Lord Roxburghe, and 12th Lord Ker of Cessford and Cavertoun.

Career
He started his military career as a lieutenant in the Royal Horse Guards. In 1895, he gained the rank of 2nd lieutenant in the service of the 4th Battalion, Argyll and Sutherland Highlanders (Militia) In 1900, he served with the Household Cavalry composite regiment in South Africa during the Second Boer War. In March 1901, he was appointed an Aide-de-camp to the Duke of Cornwall and York during his colonial tour March–October 1901. He later served in World War I, and was severely wounded.

The Duke was appointed a Member of the Royal Victorian Order in February 1901. He was appointed a Knight of the Order of the Thistle (KT) in the 1902 Coronation Honours list published on 26 June 1902, and was invested by King Edward VII at Buckingham Palace on 8 August 1902. He served as Chancellor of the Order of the Thistle from 1926 until his death.

He served as the Lord Lieutenant of Roxburghshire from 1918 until his death. He was appointed a lieutenant of the Royal Company of Archers in 1930.

Personal life
On 10 November 1903, he married Mary Goelet (1878–1937), daughter of the New York real-estate millionaire Ogden Goelet. At the time of their marriage, she was one of the wealthiest American heiresses, with a dowry of twenty million dollars, exceeded only by that of Consuelo Vanderbilt. They lived at Floors Castle on 60,500 acres, which Mary decorated with her own collection of art including a series of 17th century Gobelins Manufactory tapestries. Together, they had one child:
George Victor Robert John Innes-Ker, 9th Duke of Roxburghe (1913–1974), whose sponsor was King George. One of his godparents was Queen Alexandra.

The Duke of Roxburghe died on 29 September 1932 and was succeeded in his titles by his only son, George Victor Robert John Innes-Ker, 9th Duke of Roxburghe.

References
Notes

Sources

External links
 

1876 births
1932 deaths
8
Knights of the Thistle
Lord-Lieutenants of Roxburghshire
Members of the Royal Victorian Order
Royal Horse Guards officers
British Army personnel of the Second Boer War
British Army personnel of World War I
Deputy Lieutenants of Roxburghshire
Goelet family